This is a collection of links to "Notable people" sections of Queens neighborhood articles.

Notable people: neighborhood links 
 

<li> 
          <li> 
     <li> 
     <li> 
<li> 
<li> 
          <li> 
<li> 

 
<li> 
<li> 
<li> 
<li> 
<li> 
<li> 
          <li> 
<li> 
          <li> 
<li> 
<li> 
          <li> 

 
<li> 
<li> 
          <li> 
<li> 
<li> 
<li> 
<li> 
<li> 
<li> 
<li> 
<li> 
<li> 
<li> 

 
<li> 
<li> 
<li> 
          <li> 
<li> 
<li> 
<li> 
<li> 
<li> 
<li> 

 
<li> 
<li> 
<li> 
<li> 

 
<li> 
          <li> 
     <li> 
     <li>

Links to categories and lists 
<li> 
<li> 
<li> 
          <li> 
                    <li> 
          <li> 
<li> 

Queens
People